Minns may refer to:

Al Minns (1920–1985), American Lindy Hop and jazz dancer
Allan Glaisyer Minns (1858–1930), medical doctor, the first black mayor in Britain
Allan Noel Minns, DSO, MC, (1891–1921), English medical doctor of African-Caribbean descent, officer in the British Army during WW1
Benjamin Edwin Minns (1863–1937), Australian artist, one of Australia's foremost watercolourists
Chris Minns (born 1979), Australian politician, leader of the NSW Labor Party
Ellis Minns, FBA (1874–1953), British academic and archaeologist whose studies focused on Eastern Europe
George W. Minns (1813–1895), American lawyer and educator
Latario Collie-Minns (born 1994), Bahamian triple jumper
Lathone Collie-Minns (born 1994), Bahamian triple jumper
Martyn Minns (born 1943), English-born American bishop in the Anglican Church of Nigeria
Robert Minns (born 1940), English former cricketer
Susan Minns (1839–1938), American biologist, philanthropist and collector
Thomas Minns (born 1994), English professional rugby league footballer
Ricky Minns ("Ruddy Muddy"), graffiti artist who works by selectively wiping dirt off dirty vans

See also
Minns du den stad (Swedish for Remember the City), a 1964 novel by Swedish author Per Anders Fogelström
Minse
Minsi (disambiguation)
Minz
Munns